Nangus is a village on the Wagga Wagga to Gundagai Road on the north side of the Murrumbidgee River. From Nangus, Junee, Gundagai, Wantabadgery, Oura and Wagga Wagga are accessible. Nangus is approximately  due west of Gundagai in the Riverina area of Australia and in Gundagai Council. The nearby Nangus Station and Yabtree Station are heritage listed.

Nangus Post Office opened on 1 July 1897.

Nangus has a post office, Anglican church, general store, with an off-site liquor licence, public school, public hall, fire station, petrol station, tennis courts, and hockey fields amongst some of its services and attractions.

References

External links

Towns in the Riverina
Cootamundra-Gundagai Regional Council